A voe is an inlet in the Shetland islands of Scotland.  

Voe may refer to:

Places
Voe, Delting, a village in the civil parish of Delting, Shetland
Voe, Northmavine, a settlement in the civil parish of Northmavine, Shetland
Burra Voe, a voe on Yell, Shetland
 Burravoe, a settlement on Burra Voe 
Ronas Voe, a voe in Northmavine, Shetland
Sullom Voe, a voe between Delting and Northmavine
Sullom Voe Terminal

People
Sandra Voe (born 1936), Scottish actress
M. M. De Voe, American author
Emilie Marie Nereng (born 1995), Norwegian blogger and musician also known as "Voe"

VOE
 Verification of employment, check made by American banks and mortgage lenders
 VOE, ICAO code for Volotea, a Spanish low-cost airline
 Vacuum Operated Exhaust, an option for the 1970 Pontiac GTO automobile

See also
Heinrich Voes (died 1523), Belgian monk and martyr